Apozomus gerlachi is a species of hubbardiid short-tailed whipscorpion that is endemic to Silhouette and North Islands in the Seychelles. It is threatened by habitat degradation due to invasive plants (especially Cinnamomum verum) and sea level rise.

References

Schizomida
Endemic fauna of Seychelles
Endangered animals
Animals described in 2001